A briouat or briwat is a sweet or savory puff pastry. It is part of the Moroccan cuisine.
Briouats are filled with meat (mostly chicken or lamb) or fish and shrimp, mixed with cheese, lemon and pepper. They are wrapped in warqa (a paper-thin dough) in a triangular or cylindrical shape. Briouats can also be sweet, filled with almond or peanut paste and fried, then dipped in warm honey flavored with orange blossom water.

The briouats are fried or baked and then sprinkled with herbs, spices and sometimes with powdered sugar.

See also

 List of pastries
 List of African dishes
 Maghrebi cuisine

References

Maghrebi cuisine
Moroccan cuisine
Pastries